John B. Rahm (January 8, 1854 – July 28, 1935) was an American golfer who competed in the 1904 Summer Olympics. In 1904 he was part of the American team which won the bronze medal. He finished 23rd in this competition. In the individual competition he finished 39th in the qualification and did not advance to the match play.

He was born in Richmond, Virginia and died in Omaha, Nebraska.

References

External links
 Profile

American male golfers
Amateur golfers
Golfers at the 1904 Summer Olympics
Olympic bronze medalists for the United States in golf
Medalists at the 1904 Summer Olympics
Golfers from Virginia
Sportspeople from Richmond, Virginia
1854 births
1935 deaths